Aylmer Francis Robinson (1888–1967) was an owner of a large ranch that encompassed the island of Niihau in the Hawaiian Islands.

Life
Aylmer Francis Robinson was born May 6, 1888, at the Robinson family estate in Makaweli on the island of Kauai during the Kingdom of Hawaii. His father was Aubrey Robinson (1853–1936) and mother was Alice Gay Robinson who was his father's cousin. This made him double great-grandson of family matriarch Elizabeth McHutchison Sinclair (1800–1892).
Besides various properties on Kauai, the family owned the entire island of Niihau since 1864.

He was sent to the St. Mathew's Military School in Burlingame, California, and then graduated from Harvard University in 1910. He returned and worked at a sugarcane plantation in Waipahu, Hawaii, in 1911.

He became manager of the Makaweli ranch in 1912, and then a partner in the Gay and Robinson business, formed by his father and uncle Francis Gay.
In 1922 he took over from his father who retired from managing the ranch on Niihau. He was scheduled for one of his weekly visits when a Japanese warplane crashed on the island after the attack on Pearl Harbor in 1941. In what became known as the Niihau Incident, the pilot was captured, then freed by one of Robinson's Japanese employees. Robinson led American soldiers to the island, where the remains of both the pilot and aircraft were recovered.

A species of palm tree, Pritchardia aylmer-robinsonii was named for him by botanist Harold St. John in 1947.
Although never active himself in politics, he identified himself with the Hawaii Republican Party, and residents of the family island voted solidly Republican even after the rest of the territory and later the state of Hawaii, turned Democratic.
He never married, so when he died on April 3, 1967, the family estates went to his youngest brother Lester.
The Gay & Robinson sugar business shut down in 2009 after 120 years.

Family tree

See also
 Sugar plantations in Hawaii

References

External links
  Photo of Sinclair-Robinson family from 1893
  Family photo of Aylmer Robinson
  Photos of Niihau incident

1888 births
1967 deaths
People from Hawaii
American planters
Harvard University alumni